Ovarian serous cystadenoma, also (less precisely) known as serous cystadenoma, is the most common ovarian neoplasm, representing 20% of ovarian neoplasms, and is benign.

It has a very superficial resemblance to the most common type of ovarian cancer (serous carcinoma of the ovary) under the microscope; however, (1) it is virtually impossible to mix-up with its malignant counterpart (serous carcinoma), and (2) does not share genetic traits of indeterminate serous tumours, also called serous borderline tumours, that may transform into serous carcinoma.

Serous cystadenomas (of the ovary) are not related to serous cystadenomas of the pancreas, i.e. the presence of an ovarian or pancreatic one does not suggest an increased risk for the other one.

Diagnostic Procedures includes initially ultrasound or colour doppler study to know about size and nature of mass and sometimes CECT. Blood investigation includes CA-125 level for screening and further CEA, beta hCG levels, AFP, CA19-9, LDH level to confirm diagnosis. And before going to surgery routine investigation to be done.

Diagnosis 
Serous cystadenomas are diagnosed by histomorphologic examination, by pathologists. Grossly, they are, usually, small unilocular cysts that contain clear, straw-coloured fluid. However, they may sometimes be multilocular. Microscopically, the cyst lining consists of a simple epithelium, whose cells may be either:
be columnar and tall and contain cilia, resembling normal tubal epithelium
be cuboidal and have no cilia, resembling ovarian surface epithelium

Microscopical images

Epidemiology 
Ovarian serous cystadenoma accounts for the largest proportion of benign ovarian  tumours, making up over 50–80% of all benign epithelial ovarian tumours. Its prevalence peaks between 60–70 years of the human lifespan. Serous ovarian cystadenocarcinomas account for ~25% of serous tumours.

See also 
Ovarian cancer
Pancreatic serous cystadenoma
Serous carcinoma

References

External links 

Gynaecological neoplasia